Montes is  a toponymic surname. In Spanish, the word means "hills" and there are several locations with this name.

The surname may refer to:

 Ana Montes (born 1957), Cuban spy
 Andrés Montes (1955–2009), Spanish sports commentator
 Carlos Montes (21st century), American activist
 Conchita Montes (1914–1994), Spanish film actress
 Elias Bladimir Montes (born 1973), Salvadoran football (soccer) player
 Eugenio Montes (1900-1982), Spanish politician and writer
 Francisco Montes Reina (1804–1851), Spanish bullfighter
 Gala Montes (born 2000), Mexican actress
 Gustavo Vázquez Montes (1962–2005), Mexican politician
 Ismael Montes (1861–1933), Bolivian general and political figure
 Ingrid del Carmen Montes González (born 1985), Chemistry Professor and Director-at-large at ACS
 Jorge García Montes (1896–1982), Cuban lawyer and politician
 José Francisco Montes (19th century), President of Honduras
 Juan Alberto Montes (1902–1986), Argentinian historian
 Julia Montes (born 1995), Filipina actress
 Julio Montes Taracena
 Luis Montes (born 1986), Mexican footballer
 Miguel Montes (born 1980), Salvadoran footballer
 Pablo Montes (athlete) (born 1945), former Cuban sprinter
 Ricardo Ernesto Montes i Bradley (1905–1976), Argentine non-fiction writer
 Segundo Montes (1933–1989), scholar, philosopher, educator, sociologist and Jesuit priest
 Virginia "Ginny" Montes (1943–1994), civil rights activist and feminist
 Yolanda "Tongolele" Montes (born 1932), exotic dancer and actress

See also
 
 Montes-Bradley

Spanish-language surnames